The 2022 UCI Asia Tour is the 18th season of the UCI Asia Tour. The season began on 6 November 2021 with the Giro d'Italia Criterium and ended on 15 October 2022 with Japan Cup Criterium.

The points leader, based on the cumulative results of previous races, wears the UCI Asia Tour cycling jersey.

Throughout the season, points are awarded to the top finishers of stages within stage races and the final general classification standings of each of the stages races and one-day events. The quality and complexity of a race also determines how many points are awarded to the top finishers, the higher the UCI rating of a race, the more points are awarded.

The UCI ratings from highest to lowest are as follows:
 Multi-day events: 2.Pro, 2.1 and 2.2
 One-day events: 1.Pro, 1.1 and 1.2

Events

References

External links
 

 
2022
UCI Asia Tour
UCI